was a town located in Kurihara District, Miyagi Prefecture, Japan.

On April 1, 2005, Uguisuzawa, along with the towns of Ichihasama, Kannari, Kurikoma, Semine, Shiwahime, Takashimizu, Tsukidate and Wakayanagi, and the village of Hanayama (all from Kurihara District), were merged to create the city of Kurihara.

Geography
Uguisuzawa was located on the border between the Ōu Mountains and the Sendai plain. The Nihasama River starts here and runs through the town. The Namari River, a branch of the Nihasama also runs through Uguisuzawa.

Demographics
In October 1999, the town had an estimated population of 3,246.

The population as calculated in previous National Censuses was as follows.

History
The village of Uguisuzawa dated back to the Edo period. It gained town status on April 1, 1951, by merging with nearby Fukuro Village - Uguisuzawa comprises Fukuro, Nango, and Hosokura villages. On April 1, 2005, Uguisuzawa was dissolved as a municipality, becoming part of the city of Kurihara.

Transport

Rail
Uguisuzawa was served by the Kurihara Den'en Railway Line, which closed in March of 2007 due to low ridership. Three stations on the line were located within Uguisuzawa:
 Uguisuzawa Station
 Uguisuzawa Kōgyōkōkō Mae Station
 Hosokura Mine Park Mae Station

Road
 National Route 457

Education
 Miyagi Uguisuzawa Technical High School (renamed Iwagasaki Technical High School after merging with Iwagasaki High School in the nearby town of Kurikoma)
 Uguisuzawa Junior High School (closed/merged with Kurikoma Junior High School April 1, 2013)
 Uguisuzawa Elementary School

Places of interest
 Hosokura Mine Park
 Film set of Tokyo Tower: Mom and Me, and Sometimes Dad filmed in Uguisuzawa's Hosokura district in 2007.

Notable persons from Uguisuzawa

 Ichiro Ichikawa, politician

References

Dissolved municipalities of Miyagi Prefecture
Kurihara, Miyagi